Joseph M. Keegan (January 27, 1922 – October 21, 2007) was an American Democratic Party politician from Passaic, who served four terms in the New Jersey General Assembly and a single term in the New Jersey Senate.

After losing in his first bid for office, he won a seat in the Assembly in the 1957 elections. Keegan lost his Senate reelection bid in 1967 after supporting an unpopular bill to provide unemployment benefits for certain striking workers, at the behest of then-Governor Richard J. Hughes. Shortly thereafter, Hughes appointed Keegan to serve on the New Jersey Alcoholic Beverage Control Commission.

He was a delegate to the 1964 Democratic National Convention, in Atlantic City, New Jersey.

Keegan received a bachelor's degree from the College of the Holy Cross and a law degree from John Marshall Law School in Jersey City, New Jersey.

References

1922 births
2007 deaths
College of the Holy Cross alumni
Democratic Party members of the New Jersey General Assembly
Democratic Party New Jersey state senators
Politicians from Passaic, New Jersey
20th-century American politicians